Walter Ronald Bellett (born 14 November 1933, Stratford, London) is an English former footballer who played as a full back.

Playing career
Bellett spent time as a youngster with Grays Athletic, Arsenal, Chelmsford City and Barking and was called up for the England Youth side. In his early football career he was also based in Malaysia with the Royal Air Force.

He signed professional forms with Chelsea in September 1954 after impressing on trial, making his Football League First Division debut in February 1956 in a 2–2 draw with Manchester City. He will also be remembered as being in the iconic Tom Finney splash photograph with his appearance in it almost being completely obscured. After 35 league appearances for Chelsea he moved to Plymouth Argyle in December 1958, with the season ending with Bellett having helped the Pilgrims finishing as champions of the Football League Third Division. Although Bellett briefly dropped out of professional football when he returned to Chelmsford, he was to quickly be back in the Football League with fairly short spells at Leyton Orient, Chester, Wrexham and Tranmere Rovers.

In 1964 Bellett dropped back into non-League football with Gravesend & Northfleet, later going on to enjoy a long playing and coaching stint with Canvey Island. Away from football he worked as a car mechanic and lorry driver.

References

1933 births
Living people
Footballers from Stratford, London
English Football League players
English footballers
Association football fullbacks
Chelmsford City F.C. players
Barking F.C. players
Chelsea F.C. players
Plymouth Argyle F.C. players
Leyton Orient F.C. players
Chester City F.C. players
Wrexham A.F.C. players
Tranmere Rovers F.C. players
Ebbsfleet United F.C. players
Canvey Island F.C. players
Association football coaches